Pine View School for the Gifted, or simply known as Pine View School, is a public, college-preparatory, coeducational school located in Osprey, Florida. Pine View serves students from 2nd through 12th grades.

History 
In 1969, the school was founded as the state's first school for the intellectually gifted. The first director was John D. Woolever, an educator who had written numerous scholarly articles on education throughout his career. During the school's early history, many feared it would be closed, particularly when the school moved to its current campus, designed by Carl Abbott, FAIA, in 1994. In 2007-2008, the Florida State Legislature considered abolishing the Exceptional Student Educational (ESE) label "gifted."  On this occasion, Pine View was included in a statewide comprehensive policy assessment completed by the Florida Legislature's Office of Program Policy Analysis & Government Accountability (OPPAGA), which determined that gifted programs were thriving and that the ESE label "gifted" had more advantages than disadvantages.

At the end of the 2012–2013 school year, Steve Largo, Pine View's principal of 25 years, retired. Stephen Covert took Largo's place as Pine View principal on July 1, 2013.

In 2022, the class president's graduation speech went viral on social media and received national attention. After being told by the school principal that he could not mention LGBTQ rights in his speech, the class president instead euphemistically referred to his "curly hair" and thanked his classmates for their support.

Academic recognition

Nation rankings 
During the 2003–2004 school year, Pine View School was recognized with the Blue Ribbon School Award of Excellence by the United States Department of Education, the highest award an American school can receive.

In 2014 Pine View was ranked the number one school in Florida and the sixth-best school in the Country. In 2013, Pine View was ranked by U.S. News & World Report as the sixth-best public high school in the nation. The previous year, Newsweek ranked Pine View the 15th best public high school in the nation. Out of public and private schools, Pine View was rated the 6th best high school in the nation in 2007, 11th in 2008, 14th in 2009, 30th in 2012, and 6th in 2013 by U.S. News.
Due to its average SAT score of 1335 for 2005, the school was listed among Newsweek magazine's 21 Public Elite American high schools. It was the only Public Elite school in Florida. Pine View's U.S. News & World Report 2012 national ranking was called into question when it seemed the ranking was significantly deflated when U.S. News calculated Pine View's 8th grade students as high school students who did not participate in Advanced Placement courses (a significant factor in its methodology) and incorrectly factored Pine View's AP pass rate.

In 2019 Pine View School was ranked No. 15 in National Rankings, No. 8 in Magnet High Schools and No. 23 in STEM High Schools.

State rankings 
In 2012, the Florida Department of Education ranked Pine View as the best Florida school that combined high school students with other grade levels. The ranking was produced by crunching state and national test data. In the same year, Pine View was ranked by Newsweek as the 4th best high school in Florida. U.S. News & World Report ranked Pine View the best high school in Florida, based on its 2013 national ranking. In 2009, Pine View was rated America's Best High School for Florida by Business Week.

Admission requirements 
As a full-time gifted program, Pine View maintains selective entrance requirements. Students may be referred for admission by administrators, teachers, staff members, or parents. Prospective students are admitted based on the gifted identification standards that are required by the Florida Department of Education. Since other Sarasota County district schools house gifted programs, an important part of admission is considering if Pine View's program best meets the student's educational needs. At Pine View, students must enroll at the beginning of each school year. Other district gifted programs enroll students during the school year.

Curriculum 
Pine View's curriculum emphasizes rigor, differentiated instruction, and, in high school, students' academic self-determination. In elementary and middle school, students take classes that are accelerated and go more in-depth than topically similar courses at other schools. Students begin to rotate teachers and classrooms beginning in 4th grade. Starting in 6th grade, students are placed in different levels in math based on a standardized test administered at the end of 5th grade. Students can begin to choose some of their course load beginning in 7th grade and continuing throughout high school.

At the beginning of high school, students create their own individual four-year academic plans, which they refine and revise as the years progress. This differentiated instruction results in a variety of math, English, science, social science, and foreign language levels being offered to students in the same grade.  The substantial elective selection allows students access to breadth and depth of their interests. By the 11th grade, students exercise significant autonomy over their schedules. Students largely build their own curriculum, subject to the approval of their teachers and administrators.

Most high school courses are offered as honors (except where Florida statute prohibits the designations, such as in foreign language classes) and/or Advanced Placement (AP) courses. Students can start taking AP classes, the centerpiece of the Pine View curriculum, beginning in ninth grade. Dual Enrollment (DE) classes are also offered on campus to high school students.

Competitive teams 

 Academic Olympics – Pine View's Academic Olympic Team competes on the county and contributes to the All-County team for the state tournament. The team holds tryouts during the year for prospective members and trains and competes weekly during the season. The team won the county championship every year until 1990. More recently, the team won the 2007, 2008, 2010, 2011, 2012, 2013, 2014, 2015, 2016, and 2018 county championships.
 Speech and Debate Team – Team membership is open to all high school students who meet the membership requirements put forth in the Team Bylaws. Members are recognized as varsity competitors by the National Forensics League (NFL). The team has been recognized on the state, national, and international levels.  In the 2011–2012 school year, the team placed in the Top 32 in the world in the International Public Policy Forum World Championship, sponsored by the Bickel and Brewer Law Firm and New York University. In 2012, the National Catholic Forensic League awarded a Daniel S. Masterson, Jr. Award of Excellence in Forensics to the Pine View Speech and Debate Team for ranking in the top 5 teams in the nation. From 2000 until 2012, the team produced seven Academic-All Americans, the top NFL award.
 Model United Nations Team – Pine View's Model United Nations team is currently within the top 50 programs of its kind within the country. They have competed at Georgetown University, University of Florida, Boston University, as well as at the conferences of numerous other top-ranked programs.
 Sports – Pine View has middle school sports teams for basketball, track and field, and volleyball.
 HOSA Team – Pine View's competitive team competes on the regional, state, and international circuit annually.

Notable alumni 

 Adele Romanski, winner of the Academy Award for Best Picture for co-producing Moonlight.
 Kelly Perdew, winner of Season 2 of The Apprentice
 Ransom Riggs, filmmaker and author of the book series Miss Peregrine's Home for Peculiar Children
 Nathan J. Robinson, editor-in-chief of Current Affairs
 John Chidsey, Subway CEO

References

External links 
 Pine View School webpage
 Pine View Foundation
 Pine View's 2005-2006 FCAT grades
 Pine View Class of 1999 Website

Educational institutions established in 1969
Public education in Florida
High schools in Sarasota County, Florida
Gifted education
Public high schools in Florida
1969 establishments in Florida